U Shin Gyi (or , ; also Lord of the Sea or Conqueror of the Salty Sea) is a Burmese nat commonly venerated in the Ayeyarwady Delta region, as he is widely believed to be a benevolent guardian spirit of waterways. He is commonly depicted next to a tiger and crocodile, and is often holding a Burmese harp, as he was originally a harpist from Kasin village in Bago. According to one version of his story, while on an expedition to find food, U Shin Gyi and fellow lumberjacks landed on Meinmahla Island, and his harp-playing enticed two nat sisters, who did not allow the boat to depart the island until they were appeased. U Shin Gyi allowed himself to drown, pleasing the spirits, and in return he became a nat. A nat festival is held in his honor every March.

References

Burmese nats
Burmese culture
Deaths by drowning